Luwian Studies is an independent, private, non-profit foundation based in Zürich, Switzerland. Its sole purpose is to promote the study of cultures of the second millennium BC in western Asia Minor. The foundation encourages and supports archaeological, linguistic and natural scientific investigations to complete the understanding of Middle and Late Bronze Age Mediterranean cultures. Western Anatolia was, at that point in time, home to groups of people who spoke Luwian, an Indo-European language.

Board
The Foundation is governed by its Board, which currently includes Matthias Örtle, Ivo Hajnal, Jorrit Kelder, Jeffrey Spier and Eberhard Zangger. It is registered with the Handelsregisterambt of the Canton Zürich, under entry number CHE-364.060.070.

Research Topic
The term Luwian denotes a language and a hieroglyphic script which were commonly used in much of Asia Minor throughout the entire 2nd millennium BC. In the context of Luwian Studies, Luwian, however, is a toponym encompassing peoples of different ethnicity and languages. It is thus an abstract umbrella term for the states and petty kingdoms in western Asia Minor who for most of the time can neither be attributed to the adjacent Hittite civilization in the east, nor to the Mycenaean culture in the west. The most prominent political states in the region were Arzawa/Mira, Masa, Seha, Hapalla, Wilusa, Lukka etc. The names of these states frequently occur in documents found at Hattusa, when Hittite kings referred to their neighbours in the west.

The idea that a civilization in its own right may have existed during the 2nd millennium BC in western Asia Minor goes back one hundred years. In 1920, the Swiss Assyriologist Emil Forrer recognized the Luwian language in the documents found during the first years of excavation at Hattusa. He concluded that “the Luwians were a far greater people than the Hittites”. Similar ideas sprung up in the writing of Helmuth Theodor Bossert, another pioneer of ancient Anatolian studies, who considered the Luwians to have been a great power. The almost complete decipherment of Luwian hieroglyphic led to a string of scholarly investigations. Several monographs on Arzawa, the Luwians, and Luwian hieroglyphic inscriptions are available. Two scholars focus in their work almost entirely on Luwian hieroglyphic: Frederik Christiaan Woudhuizen and John David Hawkins.

Thus far, however, little is known archaeologically about western Asia Minor during the Middle and Late Bronze Age. Only two large-scale excavations have been conducted by European scholars and published in a western language (Troy and Beycesultan). About thirty additional excavations were conducted under Turkish direction and published in Turkish. Luwian Studies is aiming to help fill this significant research gap.

Results
Under the auspices of Luwian Studies information about altogether 486 substantial settlements sites of the 2nd millennium BC has been gathered (based on information that is already available in the academic and predominantly Turkish literature) and for the most part made public online on the foundation's website. A book summarizes the main arguments put forward and is available for free download in English, German and Turkish. The research that is supported by Luwian Studies is shedding a new light on the collapse at the Late Bronze Age in the Eastern Mediterranean and the still open question of the provenance of the Sea Peoples.

In December 2017, the so-called "Beyköy 2" inscription was published – this is a drawing of a Luwian hieroglyphic inscription that was first shown by the British hittitologist Oliver Robert Gurney at the Rencontre Assyriologique Internationale in Ghent in July 1989. If authentic, the document provides an account of the events shortly after the demise of the Hittite empire.

In December 2021, the contents of the Cypro-Minoan (Linear D) document Enkomi 1687 was made public. It is a call for help written from the Southwest Anatolian port of Limyra by a Cypriot nauarch who had encountered an attacking fleet led by the Trojan aristocrat Akamas.

Supported Projects
Luwian Studies has supported various recent fieldwork projects in Turkey, including The Konya Regional Archaeological Survey Project and the Hacıkebir Höyük Intensive Survey, as well as various academic studies on topics such as scribal and writing traditions in western Anatolia during the Late Bronze Age.

Excerpt of supported projects:
 Archaeological Landscapes of the Luwian Kingdoms of Tarhuntašša and Tabal on the Konya Plain directed by Christoph Bachhuber and Michele Massa
 An Important Bronze Age Settlement in Inland Western Anatolia: Intensive Survey Project of Tavşanlı Höyük and its Surroundings directed by Erkan Fidan and Murat Türktek
 In Search of the Missing Link: Writing in Western Anatolia during the Bronze Age by Willemijn Waal
 The Relationship between Hieroglyphic and Cuneiform Luwian: Reflections on the Origins of Anatolian Hieroglyphs by Francis Breyer
 East Aegean/western Anatolia and the Role of Aššuwa and Arzawa in Late Bronze Age Cultural Interaction by Antonis Kourkoulakos

The foundation's founder and chair of the board, Eberhard Zangger, at the same time, has recently published a number of papers on the role of astronomical knowledge in Late Bronze Age Anatolia, focusing on the Hittite sanctuary at Yazilikaya.

References

Foundations based in Switzerland
Organisations based in Zürich
Luwians
Archaeology of Turkey
History organisations based in Switzerland
Ancient Near East organizations